The Grace Episcopal Church Complex is a historic Episcopal church located at Taylor's Island, Dorchester County, Maryland, United States. The complex consists of three frame structures: a schoolhouse, chapel of ease, and Grace Episcopal Church. The chapel of ease dates from the first quarter of the 19th century and is a 20 foot by 30 foot frame structure in the Carpenter Gothic style. The school building was moved to its present site by the Grace Foundation in 1955, and was the first school house in Dorchester County and was built and used on Taylor's Island. Grace Episcopal Church is a frame structure built in the late 19th century in the Victorian Gothic style.

Grace Episcopal Church was listed on the National Register of Historic Places in 1979.

References

External links

, including photo from 1975, at Maryland Historical Trust

Churches on the National Register of Historic Places in Maryland
Gothic Revival church buildings in Maryland
Episcopal church buildings in Maryland
Churches in Dorchester County, Maryland
19th-century Episcopal church buildings
National Register of Historic Places in Dorchester County, Maryland
Taylors Island, Maryland